AD 86 (LXXXVI) was a common year starting on Sunday (link will display the full calendar) of the Julian calendar. At the time, it was known as the Year of the Consulship of Augustus and Petronianus (or, less frequently, year 839 Ab urbe condita). The denomination AD 86 for this year has been used since the early medieval period, when the Anno Domini calendar era became the prevalent method in Europe for naming years.

Events

By place

Roman Empire 
 Emperor Domitian introduces the Capitoline Games.
 Roman general (and future emperor) Trajan begins a campaign to crush an uprising in Germany.
 Germany is divided into two provinces, Germania Inferior and Germania Superior (approximate date).

Dacia 
 First Battle of Tapae: Roman legions face disaster in Dacia, when Roman general Cornelius Fuscus launches a powerful offensive that becomes a failure. Encircled in the valley of Timi, he dies along with his entire army. Rome must pay tribute to the Dacians in exchange for a vague recognition of Rome's importance.

Asia 
 Ban Gu (Pan Kou) and his sister Ban Zhao (Pan Tchao) compose the History of China.
</onlyinclude>

Births 
 September 19 – Antoninus Pius, Roman emperor (d. 161)

Deaths 
 Cornelius Fuscus, Roman general and praetorian prefect

References 

0086

als:80er#Johr 86